The 500 meters distance for men in the 2015–16 ISU Speed Skating World Cup was contested over 12 races on six occasions, out of a total of World Cup occasions for the season, with the first occasion taking place in Calgary, Alberta, Canada, on 13–15 November 2015, and the final occasion taking place in Heerenveen, Netherlands, on 11–13 March 2016.

The defending champion, Pavel Kulizhnikov of Russia, again won the World Cup, finishing with the same total points score as his compatriot Ruslan Murashov.

Top three

Race medallists

Standings 
Standings as of 31 January 2016.

References 

 
Men 0500